Diane Maliukaetau (born 12 September 1986) is a former female rugby union player. She was in the squad that won the 2006 Women's Rugby World Cup.

Maliukaetau was born in Tonga and moved to New Zealand in 1999 where she attended Tangaroa College.

Maliukaetau played six tests for the Black Ferns, including four at the 2006 Rugby World Cup when she was only 19. She scored a try in the opening match against Canada. She started in the final against England when they won their third title.

In 2010, She was named in the Black Ferns training squad ahead of the Rugby World Cup, but missed out on the final selection.

References

External links
Black Ferns Profile

1986 births
Living people
New Zealand women's international rugby union players
New Zealand female rugby union players
Female rugby union players